Elections to Hyndburn Borough Council were held in May 1982. One third of the council was up for election. Labour were defending 8 seats, The Conservatives 7. Labour held 7 seats with the Conservatives holding their 7 and the Liberal/SDP Alliance fielding a full slate of candidates taking a seat off Labour (Baxenden).

After the election, the composition of the council was:
Conservative (20)
Labour (27-1=26)
SDP (27-1=26)

Ward Results

References

1982 English local elections
Hyndburn Borough Council elections
1980s in Lancashire